United Nations Security Council Resolution 208, adopted on August 10, 1965, after noting with regret the death of Judge Abdel Hamid Badawi, a judge on the International Court of Justice, the Council decided that the election to fill the vacancy would take place during the twentieth session of the General Assembly.

The resolution was adopted without vote.

See also
List of United Nations Security Council Resolutions 201 to 300 (1965–1971)

References

Text of the Resolution at undocs.org

External links
 

 0208
 0208